The Røykenvik Line was a 7 km railway branch line between Jaren and Røykenvik.

History
The line was constructed as the original terminal stretch of the Gjøvik Line (then known as the North Line) in 1900 until the extension to Gjøvik was opened in 1902. From then the line was a branch line, which offered connection with a steam ship on Randsfjorden. Passenger traffic on the line was discontinued in 1949 and the line officially abandoned on 1 November 1957. The tracks were later removed and the corridor is now part of Route 34.

References

External links
 Jernbane.net page on the Røykenvik Line (with pictures) 

Railway lines in Norway
Railway lines in Oppland
Gjøvik Line
Railway lines opened in 1900
1900 establishments in Norway